Jarl Charpentier (17 December 1884 – 5 July 1935) was a Swedish academic and linguist who worked at Uppsala University.

Charpentier's research focused on Sanskrit literature but he was also interested in Indo-European comparative linguistics, including Iranistics, especially questions of etymology.

Selected publications 
 Charpentier, J., (1927). The Meaning and Etymology of Puja. Indian Antiquary, 56, pp. 93–98.
 Charpentier, J. ed., (1922). The Uttaradhyayanasutra. Lehmann & Stage.
 Charpentier, J., (1931). Antiochus, King of the Yavanas. Bulletin of the School of Oriental and African Studies, 6(2), pp. 303–321.

References

1884 births
1935 deaths
Academic staff of Uppsala University
Swedish orientalists